Kilen is a village in Tvedestrand municipality in Agder county, Norway. The village is located on the island Sandøya, midway between the popular tourist destinations of Kilsund and Lyngør. The village (and island) is only accessible by boat.

References

Villages in Agder
Tvedestrand